Sand Spring Township is a former township of Pope County, Arkansas. It was located on the western edge of the county.

References
 United States Board on Geographic Names (GNIS)
 United States National Atlas

External links
 US-Counties.com

Townships in Pope County, Arkansas
Townships in Arkansas